Aïn Tédelès is a district in Mostaganem Province, Algeria. It was named after its capital, Aïn Tédelès.

Municipalities
The district is further divided into 4 municipalities:
Sour
Sidi Bellater
Oued El Kheïr

Districts of Mostaganem Province